is a private university in Ina, Saitama, Japan, established in 2004.

External links
 Official website 

Educational institutions established in 2004
Private universities and colleges in Japan
Universities and colleges in Saitama Prefecture
2004 establishments in Japan